Șagu is a commune in Arad County, Romania, is situated on the Vingăi Plateau and it stretches over 10266 hectares. It is composed of five villages: Cruceni (Temeskeresztes; Kreuzstätten), Firiteaz (Féregyház), Fiscut (Temesfűzkút), Hunedoara Timișană and Șagu (situated at 15 km from Arad).

Population
According to the last census, the population of the commune counts 3862 inhabitants, out of which 91.5% are Romanians, 3.8% Hungarians, 2.7% Roma, 1.2% Germans and 0.8% are of other or undeclared nationalities.

History
The first documentary record of Șagu dates back to 1333. Cruceni was attested documentarily in 1772, Firiteaz in 1256, Fiscut in 1493, while Hunedoara Timișană in 1925.

References

Communes in Arad County
Localities in Romanian Banat
Former Danube Swabian communities in Romania